Benthoclionella jenneri, common name  Jenner's turrid, is a species of sea snail, a marine gastropod mollusk in the family Clavatulidae.

Description
The shell grows to a length of 60 mm.

Distribution
This marine species occurs off KwaZuluNatal, South Africa.

References

Bibliography

 Kilburn, R.N. (1974) Taxonomic notes on South African marine Mollusca (3): Gastropoda: Prosobranchia, with descriptions of new taxa of Naticidae, Fasciolariidae, Magilidae, Volutomitridae and Turridae. Annals of the Natal Museum, 22, 187–220
 Kilburn, R.N. (1985). Turridae (Mollusca: Gastropoda) of southern Africa and Mozambique. Part 2. Subfamily Clavatulinae. Ann. Natal Mus. 26(2), 417–470.

External links
 

Endemic fauna of South Africa
Benthoclionella
Gastropods described in 1974